Günther Neureuther (born 6 August 1955 in Steingaden) is a German former judoka who competed in the 1976 Summer Olympics and in the 1984 Summer Olympics.

References

External links
 

1955 births
Living people
German male judoka
Olympic judoka of West Germany
Judoka at the 1976 Summer Olympics
Judoka at the 1984 Summer Olympics
Olympic silver medalists for West Germany
Olympic bronze medalists for West Germany
Olympic medalists in judo
Medalists at the 1984 Summer Olympics
Medalists at the 1976 Summer Olympics
People from Weilheim-Schongau
Sportspeople from Upper Bavaria
21st-century German people
20th-century German people